Bernarda Pera defeated Anett Kontaveit in the final, 6–2, 6–4 to win the women's singles tennis title at the 2022 Hamburg European Open. It was her second WTA Tour title in as many weeks, and she neither dropped a set nor lost more than four games in any set en route to the title.

Elena-Gabriela Ruse was the defending champion, but lost in the first round to Pera.

Seeds

Draw

Finals

Top half

Bottom half

Qualifying

Seeds

Qualifiers

Lucky losers

Qualifying draw

First qualifier

Second qualifier

Third qualifier

Fourth qualifier

Fifth qualifier

Sixth qualifier

References 

2022 WTA Tour
2022 Hamburg European Open - Women's 1